Andrej Fábry (born 1 March 1997) is a Slovak footballer who plays for the Fortuna Liga club MFK Skalica as an attacking midfielder.

Club career

FC Nitra
Fábry made his Fortuna Liga debut for Nitra against Žilina on 22 July 2017 at pod Zoborom.

References

External links
 FC Nitra official club profile
 
 Futbalnet profile

1997 births
Living people
Sportspeople from Topoľčany
Slovak footballers
Slovak expatriate footballers
Slovakia under-21 international footballers
Association football midfielders
FC Nitra players
FK Jablonec players
FC DAC 1904 Dunajská Streda players
ŠKF Sereď players
MFK Skalica players
2. Liga (Slovakia) players
Slovak Super Liga players
Czech First League players
Slovak expatriate sportspeople in the Czech Republic
Expatriate footballers in the Czech Republic